The 1979 African Men's Handball Championship was the third edition of the African Men's Handball Championship, held in Brazzaville, People's Republic of the Congo, from 20 to 31 July 1979. The competition is held every two years. It acted as the African qualifying tournament for the 1980 Summer Olympics in Moscow.

In the final, Tunisia win their third title to beat Egypt in the final game.

Qualified teams

Group stage
All times are local (UTC+1).

Group A

Group B

Knockout stage

Semifinals

Third place game

Final

Final ranking
Tunisia qualified for Olympic tournament 1980 but refused to play, Egypt apparently too. So Algeria took their place.

References

1979 Men
African Men's Handball Championship
African Men's Handball Championship
African Men's Handball Championship
Handball in the Republic of the Congo
20th century in Brazzaville
Sports competitions in Brazzaville